Bermerain is a commune in the Nord department in northern France.

History
Bermerain was the scene of action to drive back the Germans at the end of World War I. A dramatic account of fighting that took place between Bermerain and Sepmeries is provided by A S Bullock in his wartime memoir, which also illustrates one of only six maps thought to have been in circulation on the day in question (27 October 1918).

Population

Heraldry

See also
Communes of the Nord department

References

Communes of Nord (French department)